Courtmacsherry railway station was on the Timoleague and Courtmacsherry Extension Light Railway. It was located in Courtmacsherry, County Cork, Ireland.

History

The station opened on 23 February 1891.

Passenger services were withdrawn on 24 February 1947.

Routes

Further reading

References

Disused railway stations in County Cork
Railway stations opened in 1891
Railway stations closed in 1947